Menemerus tropicus is a jumping spider species in the genus Menemerus that lives in Kenya and Uganda. It was first described by Wanda Wesołowska in 2007.

References

Salticidae
Spiders of Africa
Arthropods of Kenya
Arthropods of Uganda
Spiders described in 2007
Taxa named by Wanda Wesołowska